Chilliwack City Council is the governing body for the City of Chilliwack, British Columbia.

Membership
The council consists of the mayor plus 6 councillors elected to serve a four-year term. All council members are elected at-large. The most recent election took place on October 20, 2018. Members of City Council swore oaths of office on November 6, 2018 before Justice Thomas J. Crabtree.

Election results

2018
Mayor

Councillors

2014

2011

2008

2005

2003 (by-election)

Former members 

 Councillor Dorothy Kostrzewa, 1969-2008
 Mayor John Les, 1987-1999

References

External links 
 Chilliwack City Council
 2008 Election results
 2005 Election results

Municipal councils in British Columbia
Politics of Chilliwack